Micraloa emittens is a moth of the family Erebidae. It was described by Francis Walker in 1855. It is found in India and Sri Lanka.

In The Fauna of British India, Including Ceylon and Burma: Moths Volume II, the species described with Micraloa lineola, as follows:

References

  2004: A new genus is established for Bombyx lineola Fabricius, 1793, with systematic notes on the genus Aloa Walker, 1855. (Lepidoptera: Arctiidae). Atalanta 35 (3/4): 403-413.
 , 1885: On the Lepidoptera of Bombay and the Deccan. Proceedings of the Scientific Meetings of the Zoological Society of London 1885: 287-307, pl. XX-XXI, London.
 , 1855: List of the Specimens of Lepidopterous Insects in the Collection of the British Museum 3: 583-775, Edward Newman: London.

Moths described in 1855
Spilosomina
Moths of Asia
Moths of Sri Lanka